Eendragt is a village in Zeeland, Netherlands.

References

Populated places in Zeeland